Night Eyes 2 is a 1992 erotic thriller film directed by Rodney McDonald and starring Andrew Stevens and Shannon Tweed. The film is a sequel to Night Eyes (1990).

Premise
Will Griffith (Andrew Stevens) is hired to secure and protect the mansion of South American diplomat Héctor Mejenes (Richard Chaves), following attempts on his life. However, his wife Marilyn (Shannon Tweed) ends up attracted to Will.

Cast
 Andrew Stevens as Will Griffith
 Shannon Tweed as Marilyn Mejenes
 Richard Chaves as Héctor Mejenes
 Tim Russ as Jesse Younger
 Richard Chaves as Hector Mejenes
 Geno Silva as Luis
 John O'Hurley as Detective Turner
 Julian Stone as Safecracker
 Tessa Taylor as Vivian Talbot

Production
Night Eyes 2 was filmed within a month, starting on April 29, 1991, and finishing on May 25, 1991. It was filmed in Los Angeles, California.

References

External links 
 

1992 films
1990s erotic thriller films
American erotic thriller films
1990s English-language films
Films directed by Rodney McDonald
1990s American films